Aplus scacchianus is a species of sea snail, a marine gastropod mollusk in the family Pisaniidae.

Description

Distribution

References

 Gofas, S.; Le Renard, J.; Bouchet, P. (2001). Mollusca. in: Costello, M.J. et al. (eds), European Register of Marine Species: a check-list of the marine species in Europe and a bibliography of guides to their identification. Patrimoines Naturels. 50: 180–213

External links
 Philippi, R. A. (1844). Enumeratio molluscorum Siciliae cum viventium tum in tellure tertiaria fossilium, quae in itinere suo observavit. Volumen secundum continens addenda et emendanda, nec non comparationem faunae recentis Siciliae cum faunis aliarum terrarum et com fauna periodi tertiariae. Eduard Anton, Halle
 Scacchi, A. (1836). Catalogus Conchyliorum regni Neapolitani. Neapoli [Naples], Typis Filiatre-Sebetii 18 p., 1 pl
 Aissaoui C., Puillandre N., Bouchet P., Fassio G., Modica M.V. & Oliverio M. (2016). Cryptic diversity in Mediterranean gastropods of the genus Aplus (Neogastropoda: Buccinidae). Scientia Marina. 80(4): 521–533

Pisaniidae
Gastropods described in 1844
Taxa named by Rodolfo Amando Philippi